Dhanbad Municipal Corporation is the civic body that governs Dhanbad, Katras, Jharia, Sindri, and the surrounding areas in Dhanbad subdivision of Dhanbad district, Jharkhand, India. Municipal Corporation mechanism in India was introduced during British Rule with formation of municipal corporation in Madras (Chennai) in 1688, later followed by municipal corporations in Bombay (Mumbai) and Calcutta (Kolkata) by 1762. Dhanbad Municipal Corporation is headed by Mayor of city and governed by Commissioner. Dhanbad Municipal Corporation has been formed with functions to improve the infrastructure of town.

History
Dhanbad Municipal Corporation was formed in 2006 by combining erstwhile Dhanbad municipality, Jharia notified area, Sindri notified area, Katras notified area, Chattandih notified area, 27 census towns and 258 villages. It covered an area of 355.77 km2 with a population of 1,333,719 (2001 census).

During the British period, Dhanbad was a subdivision of Manbhum district. Bagsuma, located 4 miles east of Gobindpur, was the first headquarter of the subdivision. The headquarter was later shifted to Gobindpur and finally to Hirapur mouza in Dhanbad in 1908. Dhanbad was constituted as a separate district in 1956 by carving it out of Manbhum district.

Geography
Notification No. 520 dated 12 July 2008 of Jharkhand Gazette (in Hindi) provides a full list of revenue villages placed under Dhanbad Municipal Corporation.

Economy

Livelihood

In Dhanbad Municipal Corporation in 2011, amongst the class of total workers, cultivators numbered 2,376 and formed 0.74%, agricultural labourers numbered 5,174 and formed 1.62%, household industry workers numbered 8,732 and formed 2.73% and other workers numbered 303,035 and formed 94.90%. Total workers numbered 319,317 and formed 27.47% of the total population, and non-workers numbered 843,155 and formed 72.53% of the population.

Note: In the census records a person is considered a cultivator, if the person is engaged in cultivation/ supervision of land owned. When a person who works on another person's land for wages in cash or kind or share, is regarded as an agricultural labourer. Household industry is defined as an industry conducted by one or more members of the family within the household or village, and one that does not qualify for registration as a factory under the Factories Act. Other workers are persons engaged in some economic activity other than cultivators, agricultural labourers and household workers.  It includes factory, mining, plantation, transport and office workers, those engaged in business and commerce, teachers and entertainment artistes.

Demographics
As per the 2011 Census of India, Dhanbad Municipal Corporation had a total population of 1,162,472 of which 614,722 (53%) were males and 547,750 (47%) were females. Population below 6 years was 148,220. The total number of literates in Dhanbad Municipal Corporation was 805,982 (79.47% of the population over 6 years).

Language
Hindi is the official language in Jharkhand and Urdu has been declared as an additional official language. Jharkhand legislature had passed a bill according the status of a second official language to several languages in 2011 but the same was turned down by the Governor.

In the 2011 census, Hindi and Khortha was the mother-tongue (languages mentioned under Schedule 8 of the Constitution of India) of 62.5% of the population in Dhanbad district, followed by Bengali (19.3%) and Urdu (8.1%). The scheduled tribes constituted 8.4% of the total population of the district. Amongst the scheduled tribes those speaking Santali formed 77.2% of the ST population. Other tribes found in good numbers were: Munda, Mahli and Kora.

Revenue sources 

The following are the Income sources for the Corporation from the Central and State Government.

Revenue from taxes 
Following is the Tax related revenue for the corporation.

 Property tax.
 Profession tax.
 Entertainment tax.
 Grants from Central and State Government like Goods and Services Tax.
 Advertisement tax.

Revenue from non-tax sources 

Following is the Non Tax related revenue for the corporation.

 Water usage charges.
 Fees from Documentation services.
 Rent received from municipal property.
 Funds from municipal bonds.

Education
As per 2011 census, schools and colleges per 10,000 population in Dhanbad Municipal Corporation were as follows (average for the district is given in brackets): Primary 2.06 (2.46), Middle 1.42 (1.83), Secondary/ matriculation 0.62 (0.79), senior secondary 0.28 (0.32) and college 0.07 (0.06). The educational facilities available in the statutory towns/ urban areas of the district are very inadequate, in spite of the area having many mining/ industrial establishments.

See also – List of Jharkhand districts ranked by literacy rate

Wards: Electoral
Elections for the position of councilors in Dhanbad Municipal Corporation were held in 2015. The electoral outcome in different wards is as follows:

Note: The reservation chart put up by Dhanbad Municipal Corporation seems to be outdated. The Table above follows the information put up by Dhanbad Municipal Corporation.

See also
 Asansol Municipal Corporation

References

 

Municipal corporations in Jharkhand
Municipal corporations in India
2006 establishments in Jharkhand